Cheshmeh Nesai-ye Banestan (also Romanized as Cheshmeh Nesā'ī-ye Banestān; also known as Cheshmeh Nesā'ī) is a village in Sadat Mahmudi Rural District, Pataveh District, Dana County, Kohgiluyeh and Boyer-Ahmad Province, Iran. At the 2006 census, its population was 22, in 4 families.

References 

Populated places in Dana County